Abdul Bubakar was the almami of the Imamate of Futa Jallon in the late nineteenth century.

Abdul Bubakar sought to reorganize the Tukolor confederation to oppose further French advances up the Senegal River. In 1877, Bubakar was forced to recognize a French protectorate over his province. Despite this recognition, he allied with Fula and Wolof neighbors to continue fighting the French until the 1890s.

References
Citations

Sources

Year of birth missing
1891 deaths
Toucouleur Empire